David White (born 18 December 1961 in Chicago, Illinois), is an American-Australian baseball player. He competed at the 2000 Summer Olympics.

References

1961 births
Living people
Baseball players from Chicago
Baseball players at the 2000 Summer Olympics
Olympic baseball players of Australia